"Listen to a Country Song" is a song written by Al Garth and Jim Messina. It was originally recorded by Loggins and Messina on their 1971 album Sittin' In. Drummer Merel Bregante is using brushes on his drum kit rather than sticks, which helps to reflect the country feel of the song, Al Garth is playing violin and Michael Omartian is playing both tack piano and grand piano.

The song was first released as a single by American country music artist Lynn Anderson. Released in May 1972, it was the second single from her album Listen to a Country Song. The song peaked at number 4 on the Billboard Hot Country Singles chart. It also reached number 1 on the RPM Country Tracks chart in Canada.

Kikki Danielsson covered the song on her 1981 album Just Like a Woman.

Personnel

Loggins & Messina
 Jim Messina - lead vocals, electric guitar
 Kenny Loggins - harmony vocals, electric guitar
 Al Garth - violin
 Larry Sims - backing vocals, bass
 Merel Bregante - backing vocals, brushed drums
 Michael Omartian - piano, tack piano

Chart performance

References

1972 singles
Lynn Anderson songs
Columbia Records singles
Songs written by Jim Messina (musician)
Loggins and Messina songs
Kikki Danielsson songs